Ghazi High School is a school in Kabul, which has educated many of the former and current elite in Afghanistan, including Zalmay Khalilzad. It was founded by King Amanullah Khan in 1928.
It is situated in the North of the city in a district known as Carteh Chahar. It suffered severe damage during the civil war of the 1990s between the different mujahideen factions who had ousted the government of Mohammad Najibullah in 1992.

Rebuilding 
The reconstruction of Ghazi High School by both the Afghan and U.S. government was funded by the USAID’s Kabul Schools Program. The school will be able to accommodate almost 5,400 students a year.

See also 
 Education in Afghanistan
 List of schools in Kabul
 List of schools in Afghanistan

References

External links 

 https://web.archive.org/web/20160509125252/https://www.usaid.gov/afghanistan/news-information/press-releases/ghazi-high-school-reopens-new-look
 https://www.unops.org/ApplyBO/File.aspx/II_D_Technical%20Briefing.pdf?AttachmentID=f68f729b-5f5c-470c-ba54-4696b4de7489
 http://www.bitlanders.com/movie/ghazi-high-school/31588
 

Schools in Kabul
1928 establishments in Afghanistan
Educational institutions established in 1928